This is a list of late night talk show hosts in America.

See also
 List of late-night American network TV programs

References

American late-night television shows
American television talk show hosts